The 2023 WAFU Zone A Women's Cup was the second edition of the WAFU Zone A Women's Cup, an international women's football tournament contested by the women's national association football teams of West Africa zone A organized by the West African Football Union (WAFU). The tournament was hosted by Cape Verde and took place from 20 to 29 January 2023; it was the first major WAFU A tournament to be hosted in Cape Verde. The opening match was contested between Cape Verde and Guinea-Bissau at Estádio Marcelo Leitão, Sal on 20 January 2023. The final took place on 29 January 2023 at Estádio Marcelo Leitão, Sal Islands.

Senegal is the defending champions, having won the previous tournament. and they successfully defended their title beating hosts Cape Verde 1–0 with a penalty kick scored by Senegalese captain Korka Fall.

Participating nations
The WAFU Zone A initially announced on 5 January 2023 that 9 countries would participate in the tournament, a record number with all WAFU Zone A members association sending teams. Mauritania marked their debut in the tournament after its absence from the 2020 edition.

On 10 January 2022, Liberia confirmed its non-participation in the tournament citing a lack of funding from the government, thereby reducing the number of participating countries to 8. Two days prior to the tournament start Mali's sports minister confirmed that its country won't be able to participate in the 2nd edition of the tournament citing funding issues as the main reason for their withdrawal.

Did not enter

 (164)
 (82)

Venues
After the successful hosting of the 2021 CAF Women's Champions League WAFU A Qualifiers] in Mindelo and the 2023 WAFU Zone A Schools Football Championship in Santa Cruz, the Cape Verdean Football Federation announced that this time it would host the tournament in Sal Islands. the FCF selected the biggest stadium in Sal to host the tournament.

Officials
these officials were appointed by WAFU A to officiate the tournament.

Referees

  Suavis Iratunga
  Ngum Fatou
  Sylvina Garnett Welma
  Yacine Samassa
  Aissata Diarra
  Maimouna Danfakha

Assistant referees

  Evandra Furtado Da Costa Lima
  Jainaba Manneh
  Hannah Moses
  Houleye Diba
  Mariam Coulibaly
  Tabara Mbodji
  Precious Amara

Draw
The draw for the final tournament was held on 19 January 2023, on the island of Sal. the 7 teams were drawn into two groups one with four teams with the other group with three teams.

the seven teams were allocated into two pots based on the FIFA Women's World Rankings of 9 December 2022. Pot 1 contained hosts Cape Verde (who were automatically assigned to position A1) and  Senegal (who were automatically assigned to position B1). Pot 2 contained the rest of the teams.

Squads

Each team was required by WAFU-UFOA to name a squad of a minimum of 20 players (three of whom must be goalkeepers).

Group stage
Teams in each group will play one another in a round-robin, with the top two teams advancing to the knockout stage.

Tiebreakers

Teams are ranked according to points (3 points for a win, 1 point for a draw, 0 points for a loss), and if tied on points, the following tiebreaking criteria are applied, in the order given, to determine the rankings (Regulations Article 71):
Points in head-to-head matches among tied teams;
Goal difference in head-to-head matches among tied teams;
Goals scored in head-to-head matches among tied teams;
If more than two teams are tied, and after applying all head-to-head criteria above, a subset of teams are still tied, all head-to-head criteria above are reapplied exclusively to this subset of teams;
Goal difference in all group matches;
Goals scored in all group matches;
Drawing of lots.

All times are in CVT (UTC-1).

Group A

Group B

Knockout stage

Semi-finals

Third-place match

Final

Statistics

Goalscorers

Discipline
A player was automatically suspended for the next match for the following offences:
 Receiving a red card (red card suspensions may be extended for serious offences)
 Receiving two yellow cards in two matches; yellow cards expire after the completion of the quarter-finals (yellow card suspensions are not carried forward to any other future international matches)

The following suspensions were served during the tournament:

Final ranking

Controversies

Liberia withdrawal
Liberia's withdrawal from the competition after initially confirming its participation sparked high criticism among Liberians at home, especially Liberia women's National team players who showed a huge disappointment in the government and in the Liberian Football Association. Liberia's women's team's former captain Bantu Jestina Wilson stated that she felt frustrated and disappointed and that there was no lack of funding because the Ministry of youth and sports never supported the team or the women's football in the first place.

See also
2023 UNAF Women's Tournament

References

WAFU Zone A Women's Cup
2023 in African football